The Westmoreland County Courthouse is a government building of Westmoreland County located in the county seat, Greensburg, Pennsylvania. It is a contributing property to the Downtown Greensburg Historic District, but was listed separately on the National Register of Historic Places on March 30, 1978.

History 
The current building is the county's fourth courthouse and was built in 1906. The first courthouse was used from 1787 to 1801. The second courthouse was demolished in 1854 and the third was demolished in 1901. The fourth courthouse was designed in a Beaux Arts style by William S. Kaufman.

See also 
 National Register of Historic Places listings in Westmoreland County, Pennsylvania
 List of state and county courthouses in Pennsylvania

References 

Courthouses on the National Register of Historic Places in Pennsylvania
Government buildings completed in 1906
Beaux-Arts architecture in Pennsylvania
County courthouses in Pennsylvania
Buildings and structures in Westmoreland County, Pennsylvania
Greensburg, Pennsylvania
National Register of Historic Places in Westmoreland County, Pennsylvania
Individually listed contributing properties to historic districts on the National Register in Pennsylvania
1906 establishments in Pennsylvania